The Starlight Banjul is a football club from Banjul in the West African, state of Gambia. They play in the GFA League Second Division, which is the second highest league in Gambian football.

Stadium
Currently the team plays at the 3000 capacity Banjul Mini-Stadium.

Honours
GFA League First Division: 1980

References

External links

Football clubs in the Gambia